Bibik may refer to:

 A traditional Indo-Portuguese dessert also known as Bebinca

People with the surname
 Aleksei Bibik (1878–1976), a Russian novelist
 Olha Bibik (born 1990), Ukrainian sprinter
 Tatjana Bibik (born 1985), Russian badminton player
 Valentin Bibik (1940-2003), a Ukrainian Composer